Clemensia remida is a moth of the family Erebidae. It is found in Guatemala.

References

Cisthenina
Moths described in 1921